Ferdinand Tobias Richter (22 July 1651 – 3 November 1711) was an Austrian Baroque composer and organist.

Richter was born in Würzburg.  From 1675 to 1679 he served as organist at Heiligenkreuz Abbey in southern Austria. In 1683 he moved to Vienna to become court and chamber organist at the imperial court. In 1690 he was named first organist in the court chapel. He worked there until his death.

Richter's compositions include several toccatas, five suites and other pieces for keyboard. He also wrote music for a number of Jesuit school plays, operas and oratorios. His music shows a decided flair for the dramatic.

In 1699 Johann Pachelbel dedicated Hexachordum Apollinis, a collection including his famous Aria Sebaldina in F minor, to Dietrich Buxtehude and to his friend in Vienna, Ferdinand Tobias Richter.

Richter died, aged 60, in Vienna. His son Anton Karl Richter (1690-1763) was also court organist, serving from 1718 to 1751.

External links

 Entry in Grove Concise Dictionary of Music, Oxford University Press, 1994, through Gramophone.com
 Entry in Aeiou,  the Austrian cultural information system of the Federal Ministry for Education, Science and Culture

1651 births
1711 deaths
Austrian classical organists
Organists and composers in the South German tradition
German male organists
German Baroque composers
Austrian classical composers
18th-century keyboardists
18th-century classical composers
Austrian male classical composers
18th-century German composers
18th-century German male musicians
Male classical organists